Kyela is one of the seven districts of Mbeya Region, Tanzania.  It is bordered to the north by Rungwe District, to the northeast by Njombe Region, to the southeast by Lake Nyasa, to the south by Malawi and to the west by Ileje District.

In 2016 the Tanzania National Bureau of Statistics report there were 244,108 people in the district, from 221,490 in 2012.

The District Commissioner of the Kyela District is Katule G. Kingamkono.

Wards 
The Kyela District is administratively divided into 33 wards, 93 villages, and 398 vitongoji:

 Bondeni
 Bujonde
 Busale
 Ibanda
 Ikama
 Ikimba
 Ikolo
 Ipande
 Ipinda
 Ipyana
 Itope
 Itunge
 Kajunjumele
 Katumba Songwe
 Kyela Mjini
 Lusungo
 Mababu
 Makwale
 Matema
 Mbugani
 Mikoroshini
 Muungano
 Mwanganyanga
 Mwaya
 Ndandalo
 Ndobo
 Ngana
 Ngonga
 Njisi
 Nkokwa
 Nkuyu
 Serengeti
 Talatala

Agriculture 
The production of rice in Kyela is mainly favored by its geographical location and weather. Rivers such as Mbaka, Kiwira, Lufilyo and Songwe flowing into Lake Malawi all cross through Kyela. This makes the district constantly have wet land that is suitable for rice production. Apart from rice, Kyela also produces other crops like bananas, cashew nuts, beans, cocoa and watermelon.

References

External links
 Kyela District Homepage for the 2002 Tanzania National Census
 Tanzanian Government Directory Database

Districts of Mbeya Region